Shu Kei or Kenneth Ip is a Hong Kong film director and screenwriter active during the 1980s and 1990s. A graduate of The University of Hong Kong, he is best known for the 1990 film Sunless Days (沒有太陽的日子), a documentary exploring the Tiananmen Square massacre and its influence on the people of Hong Kong in the days preceding the 1997 handover of the territory to the People's Republic of China. The documentary received an OCIC Award at the 1990 Berlin International Film Festival.

Shu Kei was the dean of film and television at the Hong Kong Academy for Performing Arts from 2005 to 2016.

Selected filmography
 Hu-Du-Men (1996)

References

External links
 

Hong Kong film directors
Hong Kong screenwriters
Living people
Alumni of the University of Hong Kong
Demosistō politicians
Year of birth missing (living people)